"Gonna Catch You" is a 1991 song by American Hi-NRG singer Lonnie Gordon, written and produced by Italian group Black Box. First released around Europe in April 1991, it became the singer's second top 40 hit in the UK. It would also be Gordon's last release with her UK label, Supreme Records, which folded soon after. Months later, the single was featured in the 1991 film, Cool as Ice. SBK Records signed Gordon and released the single in the US, making it her debut solo single in her homeland. It became the first of three number one dance singles in a row for Gordon in the US.  The single also made the Billboard Hot 100, peaking at #79, and was Gordon's only hit on the soul singles chart peaking at #30.

Critical reception
Larry Flick from Billboard wrote that "this pop/house slammer, which was written and produced by the Black Box posse, is a fine intro to radio programmers here. Gordon delivers a swaggering, finger-snappin' vocal that should easily broaden her growing legion of fans." Pan-European magazine Music & Media commented, "The chorus is so catchy, that the title must come true. The saxophones give the pop/dance song a very energetic feel. A feast for dance programmers." Miranda Sawyer from Smash Hits compared the song to Jo Boxers, adding, "The record's all the better for the "Boxer Beat" or whatever it is and, indeed, is a work of cheesy genius that has you bouncing gloriously for about one and a half minute till it severely starts getting on your wick."

Track listings
 CD single, 7" single
 "Gonna Catch You" (Radio Mix) — 3:40
 "Gonna Catch You" (A cappella/Sax Mix) — 3:00

Charts

References

1991 singles
1991 songs
Dance-pop songs
House music songs
Lonnie Gordon songs
Supreme Records singles